The Earl Mack Major League All-Stars were a baseball team in the 1930s.  After the end of the 1934 season the team included Jimmie Foxx, Heinie Manush, Pinky Higgins, Doc Cramer, Ted Lyons and Earl Whitehill.

References
'1934 Jamestown Red Sox', Pitch Black Baseball (2005) Retrieved August 29, 2005.

Defunct baseball teams in the United States